Peperomia salangonis is a species of plant in the family Piperaceae. It is endemic to Ecuador.

References

Flora of Ecuador
salangonis
Endangered plants
Taxonomy articles created by Polbot
Taxa named by William Trelease